Dichazothece is a genus of flowering plants belonging to the family Acanthaceae.

Its native range is Southeastern Brazil.

Species:
 Dichazothece cylindracea Lindau

References

Acanthaceae
Acanthaceae genera